Coppelia may refer to:

 Coppélia, an 1870 comic ballet
 Coppelia (ice cream parlor), in Havana, Cuba
 815 Coppelia, a minor planet (asteroid)
 Coppelia, the Animated Doll, a 1900 French short silent film